The Athens Organizing Committee for the Games of the XXVIII Olympiad, or ATHOC, also known as the Athens Organizing Committee, was an informal name for the Athens Organizing Committee for the Games of the XXVIII Olympiad. It was also the organizing committee for the Games of the XII Paralympiad. The President of ATHOC was Gianna Angelopoulos-Daskalaki.

Board members
The members were:
 Gianna Angelopoulos-Daskalaki - President
 Lampis Nikolaou - Vice President
 Ioanna Karyofylli - General Manager
 Ioannis Spanudakis - Managing Director
 Yannis N. Pyrgiotis - Executive Director
 Marton Simitsek - Executive Director
 Theodore Papapetropoulos - Executive Director
 Dora Bakoyannis - Member
 Nikos Filaretos - Member
 Spyros Zannias - Member
 Dimitris Diathesopoulos - Member
 Nikolaos Exarchos - Member
 Panayiotis Tzanikos - Member
 Ioannis Manos - Member
 Kostas Georgiadis - Member
 Demetrios Glavas - Member
 Christos Polyzogopoulos - Member
 Pyrros Dimas - Member

References

External links

2004 Summer Olympics
2004 Summer Paralympics
Organising Committees for the Olympic Games
Organising Committees for the Paralympic Games
Summer Olympics
Sport in Athens
1997 establishments in Greece